Quirel Masse (born 7 March 1998) is Surinamese professional footballer who plays as a SVB Eerste Divisie club Inter Wanica and the Suriname national team.

References 

1998 births
Living people
Surinamese footballers
Association football defenders

N.V. Dash F.C. Inter Wanica players
SVB Eerste Divisie players
Suriname international footballers